Janine Watson (born 4 June 1981) is Australia's first taekwondo Paralympian. She won one of the bronze medals in the women's +58 kg event at the 2020 Summer Paralympics in Tokyo, Japan. She is also an Australian wheelchair tennis champion.

Personal
Watson was born on 4 June 1981. She grew up in a small rural town in south-western Queensland. At school, she played netball and tennis at state and then national levels. She completed a double degree in Exercise Science and Secondary Education. At the age of 25, she was diagnosed with multiple sclerosis. She works full-time as Head of Department for Maths and Science at one of Brisbane's most prestigious schools.

Her philosophy is "Do what I can, as well as I can, for as long as I can".

Taekwondo

After her multiple sclerosis diagnosis, she took up taekwondo and within nine months she had won her first Australian championships. Her major international results:
2014 Commonwealth Championship Scotland – Gold P34 para-poomsae
2015 World Para-taekwondo Championships Turkey – Gold P34 para-poomsae
2016 Oceania Championships Fiji – Gold P34 para-poomsae
2017 Oceania Championships New Zealand – Gold P34 para-poomsae
2017 World Para-taekwondo Championships England – Gold P34 para-poomsae
2019 World Para-taekwondo Championships Turkey – Gold P34 para-poomsae

In 2018, after a three-year break from kyorugi (sparring), she returned to the discipline, as it was included in the 2020 Tokyo Paralympics program.  Watson won Australia's first Paralympic taekwondo medal, claiming bronze in the Women's +58kg.

Wheelchair tennis
She also took up wheelchair tennis after her diagnosis.  She has won four consecutive Australian Singles Titles in Wheelchair Tennis in 2016, 2017, 2018 and 2019.

References

External links
 
 Janine Watson at Taekwondo Australia
 
 

1981 births
Living people
Australian female taekwondo practitioners
Australian female tennis players
Australian wheelchair tennis players
Paralympic taekwondo practitioners of Australia
Paralympic wheelchair tennis players of Australia
Paralympic medalists in taekwondo
Paralympic bronze medalists for Australia
Taekwondo practitioners at the 2020 Summer Paralympics
Medalists at the 2020 Summer Paralympics
People with multiple sclerosis
21st-century Australian women